František Gaulieder (18 January 1951 – 25 March 2017) was a Slovak politician. Elected to the National Council in 1994, he was expelled from the legislature in a December 1996 vote. A July 1997 ruling by the Constitutional Court of Slovakia held that Gaulieder's constitutional rights had been violated. As a result of the scandal, Slovakia was barred from joining the European Union for a time. 

Gaulieder was hit by a train in March 2017, and died at the age of 66.

References

1951 births
2017 deaths
Members of the National Council (Slovakia) 1994-1998
People's Party – Movement for a Democratic Slovakia politicians